Princess Mary Lake (Inuktitut: Tahijuaq tuklirpaar) is a lake in Kivalliq Region in the Canadian territory of Nunavut. The Kunwak River flows into it from the west and drains it in the southeast. Lake trout and lake whitefish are found in the lake, and caribou hunting and fox trapping are occasionally practised around the lake in the winter.

References

Lakes of Kivalliq Region